Ki Do-hun (born April 5, 1995,) is a South Korean actor and model He is best known for his appearance in the Korean Television Series Arthdal Chronicles (2019), and Once Again (2020)

Early life
Ki was born on April 4, 1995, in Gwangju. He studied at Chungang University.

Career
Before making his debut as an actor, he was a model under ESteem

Ki made his first onscreen appearance in the 2015 movie C’est si bon.

The 2017 drama The King in Love marked his official small screen debut, where he played the bodyguard of Im Si-wan.

His role as Park Hyo-shin in the 2020 drama Once Again helped him gain a lot of popularity.

Ki had his first leading role in the 2021 web drama Scripting Your Destiny.

In September 2021, Do-hoon signed an exclusive contract with ForStar Company.

Filmography

Film

Television series

Variety Show

References

Living people
People from Seoul
Male actors from Seoul
Models from Seoul
1995 births
South Korean male models
South Korean television actors
21st-century South Korean actors
South Korean male film actors